Melitaea arduinna, or Freyer's fritillary, is a butterfly of the family Nymphalidae. It is found from south-eastern Europe across Asia Minor to central Asia and the Altai. The habitat consists of steppe-clad slopes.

The wingspan is 45–50 mm. Similar to the Melitaea cinxia bearing likewise black dots in the submarginal reddish yellow spots of the hindwing, but the forewing much more
obtuse, distally broader, moreover usually duller coloured, being more brownish; the distal marginal area darker, the black markings being strongly developed, the median area with less markings, the black lunate lines being partly obsolescent, partly composed of irregular remnants. The underside, too, particularly on the hindwing, is essentially lighter in consequence of the black markings being broken up and reduced.

The larvae feed on Centaurea species, including C. behen. The larvae overwinter in a web nest on the host plant. Pupation takes place in a pupa which is attached to the stem of the host plant just above the ground.

Subspecies
Melitaea arduinna arduinna (south-eastern Europe, south-western Siberia, Altai, Alai, northern Tian Shan, Dzhungarsky Alatau, Tarbagatai, Saur) 
Melitaea arduinna uralensis Eversmann, 1844
Melitaea arduinna rhodopensis Freyer, [1836]
Melitaea arduinna kocaki Wagener & Gross, 1976 (Transcaucasia)
Melitaea arduinna evanescens Staudinger, 1886 (Kopet-Dagh, Ghissar-Darvaz, western Pamirs, Israel)

References

Butterflies described in 1783
Melitaea
Butterflies of Europe